Reproduction fees are charged by image collections for the right to reproduce images in publications.  This is not the same as a copyright fee, but is charged separately, as is the cost of the provision of the image. It can be charged where an image is out of copyright, and reflects the possession of the image by a collection.

Image collection charges vary according to the media (books, magazines, TV, Internet etc.), and print run. Some charge a lower fee for not-for-profit publications. In the case of the Web, none appear to grant use  in perpetuity, but for small blocks of time — 3 months, 6 months, etc. Some institutions employ specialist firms to administer their copyrights and reproduction fees.

In recent years the money asked per image can be so great as to make the publication of limited-market topics un-viable, by the time the other production costs are factored in. This is likely to have a deleterious effect on the future health of specialist academic publishing worldwide. The expansion of public domain image resources appear to be the way of overcoming this problem.

On the other hand, the fees can help a collection to balance its finances.

See also
 The court case Bridgeman Art Library Ltd. v. Corel Corporation established that exact photographic copies of public domain works of art are not copyrightable under United States law.

External links
 Elaine M. Stainton Photo Reproduction Fees and Designations: Three Modest Proposals (concerning fine art reproduction fees)

Stock photography